Matri Sneha is a 1923 Bengali film directed by Jyotish Bannerjee. The film was made under the banner of Madan Theatres Pvt. Ltd.

Cast 
 Akshay Babu as Ganesh
 Amar Choudhury as Pagal
 Patience Cooper as Leela		
 Tulsi Lahiri as Nirmal
 Edwin Mayer as Dulal
 Miss Kumud
 Niradasundari
 Prabha Devi
 Sushila Sundari
 Ashalata Wabgaonkar

See also 
 Tritiya Paksha

References

External links 
 

Bengali-language Indian films
Indian silent films
Indian black-and-white films